Phrynocephalus sakoi is a species of agamid lizard endemic to Oman.

References

sakoi
Endemic fauna of Oman
Reptiles described in 2015
Taxa named by Daniel Andreevich Melnikov
Taxa named by Roman A. Nazarov
Taxa named by Natalia B. Ananjeva